Bogdan Irkük a.k.a. BULGARI (Богдан Иркук а.к.а. БУЛГАРИ) is a Bulgarian musician/producer/DJ. He has previously performed under the name BULGARI.

Biography
Bogdan Irkük was born 1976 in Sofia, Bulgaria. His mother is of Hutsul ancestry. He grew up listening to the music of his brother's friend's pirate radio station, where he learned to appreciate Chic, Chaka Khan, Zapp, Stevie Wonder and Electric Light Orchestra.

He started releasing material after meeting the Rollerboys at a DJ gig in Munich.

Style
Irkük's style draws heavily from Italo disco, New York and Chicago house, and other forms of early styles of electronic dance music. Use of vocoders and analog synthesizer sounds are common in his songs. Irkük produces music on Ableton Live.

Discography

Releases
 The Distant EP (Rollerboys Recordings, 2007)
 The Coastal EP (Rollerboys Recordings, 2008)
 Everything Is Changing (Soul Jazz Records, 2008)
 When I Dream of New York (Epic Disco Vol. 1) (Rollerboys Recordings, 2009)
 The Thracian EP (Rollerboys Recordings, 2011)
Twice (Djurriket Records, 2011)

Remixes
 Jens Lekman "Sipping on the Sweet Nectar" (Service/Rollerboys Recordings, 2008)
 Al Usher "Lullaby For Robert" (Internasjonal, 2009)
 Sally Shapiro "Miracle" (Permanent Vacation, 2009)

Compilations
 Body Language Vol.5 by Chateau Flight "The Distant Message(Arken Remix)" (Get Physical, 2007)
 Nu Balearica by Fred Deakin "Space Reflecting on the Bosporos" (Ministry of Sound, 2008)
 Singles 2008–2009 "Everything Is Changing" (Soul Jazz Records, 2009)

References

External links
 Official Website
 Bogdan Irkük on Myspace
 

Bulgarian electronic musicians
1971 births
Living people